The Boston National Historical Park is an association of sites that showcase Boston's role in the American Revolution and other parts of history. It was designated a national park on October 1, 1974. Seven of the eight sites are connected by the Freedom Trail, a walking tour of downtown Boston. All eight properties are National Historic Landmarks.

Five of the sites that make up the park are neither owned nor operated by the National Park Service, and operate through cooperative agreements established upon the park's creation.   The park service operates visitor centers in Faneuil Hall and at the Charlestown Navy Yard.

Boston National Historical Park, along with Boston African American and Boston Harbor Islands, comprise the National Parks of Boston, all under the same superintendent.

Locations

Park Properties

Bunker Hill Monument 
The Bunker Hill Monument, located at the top of Breed's Hill in the Charlestown neighborhood of Boston, is a granite obelisk that was constructed in the mid-19th century to commemorate the Battle of Bunker Hill, fought June 17, 1775.  The property is owned and administered by the National Park Service.

Bunker Hill Museum 
The park operates a small museum dedicated to the battle of Bunker Hill and other associated history, across the street from monument grounds. The museum is known for its large-scale diorama of the battle on the second floor.

Charlestown Navy Yard 
The Charlestown Navy Yard is located on the southern edge of Charlestown on the banks of the Charles River. Used during the American Revolutionary War as a shipyard, it continued to serve as a base of the United States Navy until 1975, when the Navy turned the property over to the National Park Service.

Dorchester Heights 
Dorchester Heights was fortified by General George Washington in March 1776, compelling the British to withdraw from Boston and ending the Siege of Boston.  A monument was erected on the site in 1902.  Located in South Boston, Dorchester Heights is the only site in the park that is not on the Freedom Trail.

Affiliated Sites and Freedom Trail Partners

Faneuil Hall 

Faneuil Hall was first constructed in the 1740s, and was the site of important pro-independence speeches.  The hall is owned and operated by the city of Boston, with the park service offering talks in the Great Hall.

Old North Church 
The Old North Church, built in 1723, was the location where Paul Revere had signal lanterns lit on the night of April 18, 1775, prior to his "midnight ride" that led to the Battles of Lexington and Concord and the start of the revolutionary war.  The church, the oldest operating in Boston, has an Episcopalian congregation, which owns and operates the building.

Old South Meeting House 

The Old South Meeting House, built in 1729 was the site of numerous pre-revolutionary meetings, including one, attended by a crowd estimated at more than 5,000, on the evening prior to the Boston Tea Party in December 1773.  It served as a church until 1877, when it became a museum operated by a nonprofit organization dedicated to its preservation.

Old State House 
The Old State House is the oldest municipal building in Boston.  Built in 1713, it was the seat of the Colonial government, and afterward the State government, until 1798.  The Boston Massacre took place in front of the building in 1770.  In 1881 it was saved from destruction by the Bostonian Society, which was formed specifically to preserve it.  The society still operates the City owned building as a museum.  The Boston Massacre is reenacted regularly under the society's auspices.

Paul Revere House 
The Paul Revere House is one of the oldest surviving buildings in Boston.  It was built in 1680, and was purchased by Paul Revere in 1770. Today it is owned and operated by the Paul Revere Memorial Association as a museum.

Park Service activities
The National Park Service, in addition to managing its properties that are part of the park, operates visitor centers at Faneuil Hall (1st Floor) and at the Navy Yard.  It offers guided tours of the Freedom Trail.  The Navy offers tours of USS Constitution, which is adjacent to the Park Service's visitor center at the Navy Yard.

See also
National Register of Historic Places listings in northern Boston, Massachusetts
National Parks of Boston
Freedom Trail
USS Cassin Young
USS Constitution
Cassius Cash

References

External links

 National Park Service website for the park
  National Park Service Salem, Massachusetts website
 Freedom Trail Foundation - official website of the Freedom Trail
 Paul Revere House - official website
 Bostonian Society - official website of the Old State House
 Old South Meeting House - official website
 Old North Church - official website
 Faneuil Hall - City of Boston website

 
American Revolutionary War sites
Massachusetts in the American Revolution
National Register of Historic Places in Boston
National Historical Parks in Massachusetts
Protected areas established in 1974
Museum organizations
Parks in Boston
1974 establishments in Massachusetts
National Historical Parks of the United States